The Orchardist (2012) is a novel by American author Amanda Coplin set in the Pacific Northwest at the turn of the 20th century.

Synopsis 
Haunted by the disappearance of his younger sister forty years earlier, William Talmadge has taken refuge in the careful tending of his isolated apple orchard. His solitary life is shared only with the local midwife, Caroline Middey, and Clee, a Nez Perce horseman and childhood friend.  Then two half-wild, starving and very pregnant teen-aged girls arrive. They are Jane and Della, sisters who have escaped the abuse of a brothel and its proprietor Michaelsen. Curious, but respectful of their wariness, Talmadge patiently cultivates their trust and creates a haven for them among his trees. A series of tragedies leaves Jane's baby daughter, Angelene, in Talmadge's care and sets Della on a lifelong journey to reconcile her own demons.

Awards 
 2013 American Book Award
 2013 Washington State Book Award for Fiction
 2012 Barnes & Noble Discover Award

Bibliography

References 

2012 American novels
Novels set in Washington (state)
American Book Award-winning works
HarperCollins books